A rector of a Dutch university is called a rector magnificus. The following people have been rector magnificus of Delft University of Technology or its predecessor, Technische Hogeschool Delft:

References 

Lists of office-holders in the Netherlands
Science-related lists
Delft University of Technology
 
 
Lists of Dutch people by occupation